Twenty-four Pieces for Children (also 24 Pieces for Children), Op. 25, is a 1936 romantic piano composition written in all twenty-four major and minor tonalities by Ukrainian pianist and composer Viktor Kosenko. Naturally treated with techniques of folk polyphony, it was published as Op. 15 in 1938, but later corrected by the publisher of his collection Musiczna Ukraina. It is still an obligatory set of compositions specifically for children learning the piano in conservatoires and piano schools across the country by holding a significant place in today's Ukrainian pedagogical repertoire as one of the most popular collections for children.

Description
{| class="wikitable unsortable" style="text-align: center"
|-
! No.
! Name
! Key
! Tempo
! Score
|-
|1
| style="text-align: left" | Petroushka 
| C major
| Allegro mosso
| 
|-
|2
| style="text-align: left" | After a Butterfly 
| A minor
| Presto
| 
|-
|3
| style="text-align: left" | Pioneer's Song 
| G major
| Allegro alla marcia
| 
|-
|4
| style="text-align: left" | Ukrainian Folk Song 
| E minor
| Moderato
| 
|-
|5
| style="text-align: left" | On the Edge of the Forest 
| D major
| Allegro moderato
| 
|-
|6
| style="text-align: left" | Waltz 
| B minor
| Tempo di Valse lento
| 
|-
|7
| style="text-align: left" | Morning in the Orchard 
| A major
| Allegro vivace
| 
|-
|8
| style="text-align: left" | They Don't Want to Buy a Teddy Bear 
| F minor
| Moderato
| 
|-
|9
| style="text-align: left" | They Have Bought a Teddy Bear 
| E major
| Prestissimo
| 
|-
|10
| style="text-align: left" | Polka 
| C minor
| Allegro gusto
| 
|-
|11
| style="text-align: left" | Pastorale 
| B major
| Andante
| 
|-
|12
| style="text-align: left" | Melody 
| G minor
| Andantino cantabile
| 
|-
|13
| style="text-align: left" | In March! 
| G major
| Allegro marciale
| 
|-
|14
| style="text-align: left" | Little Rain 
| E minor
| Allegro scherzando 
| 
|-
|15
| style="text-align: left" | Lullaby 
| D major
| Moderato
| 
|-
|16
| style="text-align: left" | Étude 
| B minor
| Allegro molto
| 
|-
|17
| style="text-align: left" | Little Jumping-rope 
| A major
| Allegro vivo
| 
|-
|18
| style="text-align: left" | Ballet Scene 
| F minor
| Allegretto scherzando
| 
|-
|19
| style="text-align: left" | Humoresque 
| E major
| Allegro non troppo
| 
|-
|20
| style="text-align: left" | Mazurka 
| C minor
| Allegretto semplice
| 
|-
|21
| style="text-align: left" | Pljasovaja Dance 
| B major
| Allegro mosso
| 
|-
|22
| style="text-align: left" | Fairytale 
| G minor
| Allegro commodo
| 
|-
|23
| style="text-align: left" | Young Budyonnovs' March 
| F major
| Allegro marciale
| 
|-
|24
| style="text-align: left" | Toccatina 
| D minor 
| Allegro di molto
| 
|-
|}

See also
 List of compositions by Viktor Kosenko

References

External links 
 Twenty-four Pieces for Children at the IMSLP

1936 compositions
Kosenko
Compositions by Viktor Kosenko
Compositions for solo piano